Midway, Halifax County, Virginia may refer to:
Midway (near Buffalo Springs), Halifax County, Virginia
Midway (near Scottsburg), Halifax County, Virginia